Beautiful Dreamers is a 1990 Canadian film directed by John Kent Harrison. It stars Colm Feore and Rip Torn. It was nominated for four Genie Awards in 1991.

Synopsis

Rip Torn is the American poet Walt Whitman. The setting is a 19th-century Canadian institution for the mentally retarded. A compassionate London, Ontario, doctor named Richard Bucke(Colm Feore) defies his superiors by treating his patients as human beings rather than animals. When Whitman champions his cause, the doctor is ostracized by those who fear the poet's reputation as a freethinking radical. Based on a true incident – Whitman spent the summer with Dr. Bucke in 1880.

Cast
Colm Feore as Richard Maurice Bucke
Rip Torn as Walt Whitman
Wendel Meldrum as Jessie Bucke
Sheila McCarthy as Molly Jessop
Colin Fox as Rev Haines
Roland Hewgill as Timothy Pardee

References

External links
.

Canadian drama films
1990 films
C/FP Distribution films
Films directed by John Kent Harrison
1990 directorial debut films
1990s English-language films
English-language Canadian films
Walt Whitman
1990 drama films
1990s Canadian films